Point Blue Conservation Science, founded as and formerly named the Point Reyes Bird Observatory (PRBO), is a California-based wildlife conservation and research non-profit organization.

Overview
Point Blue was founded in 1965 to study bird migration along the Pacific flyway, and has the longest running population study of landbirds in North America west of the Mississippi river (continuous since 1966) located in Marin County, north of San Francisco, as well as maintaining a year-round research presence on the Farallon Islands since 1969. 

Point Blue is headquartered in Petaluma, California with several active field research stations and sites throughout California. Their field station in Bolinas, Ca offers environmental education, guided tours of the mist-netting process used to study birds, and seasonal interns are there all year learning about banding/studying birds. In June 2013, the organization changed its name to Point Blue Conservation Science.

Initiatives
The organization's top priorities are to understand and project the effects of climate change and other environmental stressors on nature and wildlife in order to benefit birds, other wildlife and people.

In collaboration with Conserve.IO (EarthNC), Cordell Bank National Marine Sanctuary, Gulf of the Farallones National Marine Sanctuary and Channel Islands National Marine Sanctuary, Point Blue has developed the “Whale Aware” program, a new system for gathering near-real-time data on where whales are congregating so marine management agencies can alert ship operators and help prevent collisions with endangered whales in the San Francisco and Channel Islands regions.

Personnel
Point Blue employs around 140 staff and seasonal biologists and around 14 education and outreach staff, who focus on scientific research, conservation biology, and outreach.

References

Further reading
 Ralph, C. John; Geupet, Geoffrey R. (2019). "Point Reyes Bird Observatory to Point Blue Conservation Science: the Origins, Evolution, and Future Directions of an Innovative, Non-Profit, Science Organization". Chapter 7. Contributions to the History of North American Ornithology, volume IV. Memoirs of the Nuttall Ornithological Club No. 24. Cambridge, MA: Nuttall Ornithological Club.

Ornithological organizations in the United States
Zoological research institutes
Research institutes in California
Bird observatories in the United States
Science and technology in the San Francisco Bay Area
Petaluma, California
Environmental organizations based in the San Francisco Bay Area